Line 4 or 4 Line may refer to:

Public transport

Asia
Line 4 (Chennai Metro), or Orange Line, under construction in India
Busan Metro Line 4, a rubber-tyred metro line in Busan, South Korea
Kolkata Metro Line 4 or Noapara Barasat Line, under construction in India
Manila Light Rail Transit System Line 4, Metro Manila, Philippines
Line 4 (Mumbai Metro), under early stages of construction
Line 4 (Osaka) or Chūō Line, in Japan
Seoul Subway Line 4, a line across the National Capital Area, South Korea
Sri Petaling Line, the fourth rapid transit line in Klang Valley, Malaysia
Zhonghe–Xinlu line, a metro line in Taipei, Taiwan

China
Line 4 (Beijing Subway), a subway line in Beijing
Line 4 (Changchun Rail Transit), a metro line in Changchun, Jilin
Line 4 (Changsha Metro), a metro line in Changsha, Hunan
Line 4 (Chengdu Metro), a metro line in Chengdu, Sichuan
Line 4 (Chongqing Rail Transit), a metro line in Chongqing
Line 4 (Dongguan Rail Transit), a planned metro line in Dongguan, Guangdong
Line 4 (Fuzhou Metro), a line under construction in Fuzhou, Fujian
Line 4 (Guangzhou Metro), a metro line in Guangzhou, Guangdong
Line 4 (Hangzhou Metro), a metro line in Hangzhou, Zhejiang
Line 4 (Hefei Metro), a metro line in Hefei, Anhui
Line 4 (Kunming Metro), a metro line in Kunming, Yunnan
Line 4 (Nanchang Metro), a metro line in Nanchang, Jiangxi
Line 4 (Nanjing Metro), a metro line in Nanjing, Jiangsu
Line 4 (Nanning Metro), a metro line in Nanning, Guangxi
Line 4 (Ningbo Rail Transit), a metro line in Ningbo, Zhejiang
Line 4 (Qingdao Metro), a metro line in Qingdao, Shandong
Line 4 (Shanghai Metro), a metro line in Shanghai
Line 4 (Shenzhen Metro), a metro line in Shenzhen, Guangdong
Line 4 (Suzhou Rail Transit), a metro line in Suzhou, Jiangsu
Line 4 (Tianjin Metro), a metro line in Tianjin
Line 4 (Wuhan Metro), a metro line in Wuhan, Hubei
Line 4 (Wuxi Metro), a metro line in Wuxi, Jiangsu
Line 4 (Xi'an Metro), a metro line in Xi'an, Shaanxi
Line 4 (Zhengzhou Metro), a metro line in Zhengzhou, Henan

Europe
Line 4 (Athens Metro), a proposed metro line in Greece
Barcelona Metro line 4, a line in Spain
Rodalies Barcelona line 4, a commuter railway in Spain
Line 4 (Metro Bilbao), a proposed line
Line 4 (Bucharest Metro), a line in Romania
Line 4 (Budapest Metro), a line in Hungary
Line 4 (Madrid Metro), a line in Spain
Line 4 (Milan metro), an underground rapid transit line under construction in Italy
Line 4 (Moscow Metro), a metro line in Moscow, Russia
Paris Métro Line 4, a line in France
Paris Tramway Line 4, a tram-train line just outside the limits of Paris proper
Line 4 (Saint Petersburg Metro), a metro line in Saint Petersburg, Russia
U4 (Vienna U-Bahn), a line in Austria

Oceania
 Eastern Suburbs and Illawarra Line, coded T4, coloured navy, a train line in Sydney, New South Wales.

North America
Line 4 Sheppard, a subway line in Toronto, Canada
Yellow Line (Montreal Metro), formerly known as Line 4, in Canada
Mexico City Metro Line 4, a rapid transit line in Mexico City
Route 4 (Baltimore), a bus route in the United States
No. 4 Line (Baltimore streetcar), replaced by MTA Maryland Route 15
4 (New York City Subway service), a subway line in New York City
4 (Los Angeles Railway), streetcar lines in Los Angeles

South America
Line 4 (Rio de Janeiro), a line under construction in Brazil
Line 4 (São Paulo Metro), a line under construction in Brazil
Santiago Metro Line 4, in Chile
Santiago Metro Line 4A, in Chile

Measurement
4-line, obsolete measure in Line
4-line, 12.17x44mm ammunition or a rifle which fires it

See also
 4 Train (disambiguation)